Beth Sarim (Hebrew בית שרים "House of the Princes") is a ten-bedroom mansion in San Diego, California, constructed in 1929 in anticipation of various resurrected Old Testament biblical  patriarchs or prophets such as Abraham, Moses, David, Isaiah and Samuel. It was maintained by the Watch Tower Society, the parent organization used by Jehovah's Witnesses, and was also used as a winter home and executive office for Watch Tower president Joseph Franklin Rutherford. The house was sold to a private owner in 1948.

Background

In 1918, Watch Tower publications began predicting, under the direction of Rutherford, that Old Testament patriarchs or "princes" would be resurrected back to earthly life in 1925. It was taught that these "princes" would become earth's new leaders and that their resurrection would be a prelude to the inauguration of a new earthly society and the abolition of death. (It had previously been taught that these individuals were to be raised shortly after 1914.) These "princes" would use Jerusalem as their capital, with some of the "princes" being located in other "principal parts of the earth". Despite the failure of this prediction, Rutherford continued to preach their imminent return.

During this time, Rutherford spent winters in San Diego, California, for health reasons, and "in time, a direct contribution was made for the purpose of constructing a house in San Diego for brother Rutherford's use". The property was acquired in October 1929 by Robert J Marten and was given to Rutherford in December for the nominal fee of $10 (current equivalent $). The house was built in that year. 

Rutherford named the property Beth Sarim and dedicated it for the use of the expected Old Testament "princes", who were now expected to be headquartered in San Diego instead of Jerusalem. The deed for Beth Sarim, written by Rutherford, said that the property was to be held "perpetually in trust" for the Old Testament "princes" and was to be surrendered to them once they arrived. 

The  residence, designed by San Diego architect Richard S. Requa, is a ten-bedroom Spanish mansion with an adjacent two-car garage. The building costs at the time were about $25,000 (current equivalent $). Writing in the book Salvation in 1939, Rutherford explained that Beth Sarim would forever be used by the resurrected "princes".

Occupation
 
Rutherford moved into Beth Sarim in early 1930 and served as caretaker of the property awaiting the resurrection of the "princes". Newspapers of the time reported on Rutherford's lavish lifestyle, which included a 16-cylinder Fisher Fleetwood Cadillac coupe. The residence was cited by Olin R. Moyle, former legal counsel for Jehovah's Witnesses, in a letter to Rutherford in 1939, as one of the examples of "the difference between the accommodations furnished to you, and your personal attendants, compared with those furnished to some of your brethren". 

Walter F. Salter, former manager of the Canadian branch of the Watch Tower Society, also criticized Rutherford's use of Beth Sarim. A reply to Salter's criticisms of Rutherford was published in the May 2, 1937, Golden Age, with a photocopy of a letter from W. E. Van Amburgh, Secretary-Treasurer of the Watch Tower Society, stating:

The magazine Consolation (successor to The Golden Age) explained that Beth Sarim served as Rutherford's winter headquarters:

Rutherford's burial
Rutherford died at Beth Sarim on January 8, 1942, at the age of 72. After his death, Rutherford's burial was delayed for three and a half months due to legal proceedings arising from his desire to be buried at Beth Sarim, which he had previously expressed to three close advisers from Brooklyn headquarters. Watchtower attorney Hayden C. Covington explained his role in the lawsuit: "I filed a lawsuit then in the courts out there in San Diego to force them to let us bury him out there on that property.

Judge Mundo, who was the judge of the Superior Court, heard it and passed the buck, jumping from one thing to another, from one technicality to another, and finally after looking at the matter in a reasonable way Bill, Bonnie, and Nathan and all of us decided that we have fought enough on this and it looks like it's the Lord's will that we take his body back to Brooklyn, and have him buried in Staten Island, which we did." Witnesses collected over 14,000 signatures on a petition that Rutherford's dying wish might be granted. The May 27, 1942, Consolation explained:

Consolation condemned San Diego County officials for their refusal to grant a permit for Rutherford's burial at Beth Sarim or on a neighboring property named Beth Shan, also owned by the Watchtower Society:
 
After all appeals were exhausted, Consolation stated that Rutherford's remains were shipped to New York where he was buried on April 25, 1942. Critics have speculated that Rutherford was secretly buried at Beth Sarim. The May 4, 1942, issue of Time noted Rutherford's burial at Rossville, New York, on Staten Island; a private burial plot for Watch Tower branch volunteers is on Woodrow Road. The exact grave location is unmarked; in 2002, a caretaker at Woodrow United Methodist Church and Cemetery (an adjoining graveyard) answered an inquiry about Watch Tower's plot by noting "I couldn't tell you who is buried on it because it has absolutely no markers or headstones or anything."

Sale of property

After Rutherford's death, the Watchtower Society maintained Beth Sarim for a few years, before selling the property in 1948. The belief that the "princes" would be resurrected before Armageddon was abandoned in 1950. In 1954, when asked at a trial in Scotland why the property was sold, Frederick William Franz—then vice president of the Watch Tower Society—explained:

The house is now privately owned and has been designated Historical Landmark number 474 by the City of San Diego.

See also
Eschatology of Jehovah's Witnesses
History of Jehovah's Witnesses

References

External links

Google Maps Street View of Beth Sarim
Rutherford's Unfinished Burial Crypt at Beth Sarim
The Story of Beth Sarim
1993 Visit to Beth Sarim—Audio and Pictures
Rutherford's Lavish Lifestyle—Critical Interpretation of Beth Sarim
Beth Sarim and the Other House

Houses completed in 1929
Beliefs and practices of Jehovah's Witnesses